Michael Healy was an Irish hurler. At club level he played for Mount Sion and was a substitute on the Waterford senior hurling team that won the 1948 All-Ireland Championship.

References

Mount Sion hurlers
Waterford inter-county hurlers
Year of birth missing (living people)
Possibly living people